Smedby is a locality situated in Kalmar Municipality, Kalmar County, Sweden with 3,487 inhabitants in 2010.

References 

Populated places in Kalmar County
Populated places in Kalmar Municipality